The Latin Union is an international organization of nations that use Romance languages, whose activities have been suspended since 2012. Headquartered in Paris, France, its aim is to protect, project, and promote the common cultural heritage of Romance peoples and unifying identities of the Romance, and Romance-influenced, world. It was created in 1954 in Madrid, Spain. It started to operate in 1983 and its membership rose from 12 to 36 states, including countries in North America, South America, Northern Europe, Southern Europe, Africa, and the Asia-Pacific region.

Due to financial difficulties, the Latin Union announced on 26 January 2012 the suspension of its activities, the dissolution of its Secretariat General (effective 31 July 2012) and termination of employment for all the organization's personnel.

Membership
According to the Latin Union's website, membership was open to any nation that met the following criteria:

Linguistic criteria:
Latin-derived language as official language, used in education, and commonly used in the mass media or in daily life
Linguistic/cultural criteria:
Existence of significant literature in a Latin-derived language
Press and publication in Latin-derived language
Television with a strong proportion of the programming in a Latin-derived language
Radio widely broadcast in a Latin-derived language
Cultural criteria :
Direct or indirect inheritance of the legacy of Ancient Rome, to which the state remains faithful and which it perpetuates mainly through the education of Latin
Cultural education of Latin-derived foreign languages
Exchange programmes with other Latin countries
Societal organization, particularly in the legal plane, based on respect for fundamental liberties, the general principles of human rights and democracy, tolerance, and freedom of religion

Official languages
The official languages of the Latin Union were Spanish, French, Italian, Portuguese, Romanian, and Catalan. Spanish, French, Italian and Portuguese were used as working languages. All the texts of general diffusion were translated into these four languages, with some also going into Romanian and Catalan.

Member states

Spanish

French

Portuguese

Italian

Romanian

Catalan

 Catalan is also co-official in Catalonia, Valencian Community, Balearic Islands and some other areas of Spain and in Alguer (Italy).
 Also spoken in Pyrénées-Orientales, France.

Observers

Organization
The Union was composed of three main bodies, namely, the Congress, the Executive Council, and the General Secretariat.

Congress
The Congress, which consisted of the representatives of all the Member States, met in ordinary assembly every two years. Its main functions were

 to adopt the budget,
 to define the general direction of the Union,
 to receive the new Member States formally, and
 to elect and appoint different Member States to be the Presidents, Vice-Presidents, and members of the sub-organisations of the Union.

A President and two Vice-Presidents were also elected by the Congress. Oleg Serebrian from the Republic of Moldova was the last President.

There were also two auxiliary bodies of the Congress, namely, the Commission of Adhesions and the Commission of Candidacies.

 The Commission of Adhesions was composed of 10 Member States and was responsible for promoting the adherence of all the Member States of the Union.
 The Commission of Candidacies was composed of 9 Member States and was responsible for examining the validity of the candidacies, taking account of the geographical and linguistic-cultural division.

Executive Council
The Executive Council was the executive branch of the Union. It consisted of 12 Member States, which were elected by the Congress every four years, and led by a President and two Vice-Presidents, which were also elected by the Congress.

There were also two auxiliary commissions subordinated to the Executive Council: 
 The Commission of Finance and Programmes
 The Commission of Statues

General Secretariat
The Latin Union was directed by a Secretary-General appointed every four years by the Congress. The Secretary was in charge of the execution of the programmes and implemented the decisions made by the Congress and the Executive Council in the matter of budget and general direction. Jose Luis Dicenta Ballester was at one time Secretary-General of the Union.

Subordinated to the Secretary-General, there were 4 directors:
 Director of Administration and Finance
 Director of Culture and Communication
 Director of Promotion and Education of the Languages
 Director of Terminology and Industry of the Language

Finance
The finance of the Union was mainly supported by the obligatory contributions from the Member States. For some activities, the Union may have collaborated with other public or private institutions.

See also

 Community of Portuguese Language Countries
 Lusophone
 Italic peoples
 Latin America
 Latin Bloc (proposed alliance)
 Latin Monetary Union
 Organisation internationale de la Francophonie
 Organization of Ibero-American States
 Association of Academies of the Spanish Language
 Hispanic
 Hispanidad
 Hispanic America
 Ibero-America
 Panhispanism
 Pan-Latinism
 Romance languages
 Romance-speaking world
 United States of Latin Africa

References

External links
 Official site

Intergovernmental organizations
Latin America
Spanish language
French language
Italian language
Portuguese language
Romanian language
Country classifications
Organizations established in 1954
Organizations disestablished in 2012
Former confederations
Organizations based in Paris
1954 establishments in Spain
Catalan language